Leipzig School may refer to:

Junggrammatiker
Leipzig school (sociology)
Leipzig School (translation), translation and interpreting studies
Leipzig school (painting)
New Leipzig School, its descendant